Shine-Ider is a sum of Khövsgöl aimag. The area is about 2,050 km², of which 1,700 km² are pasture. In 2000, the sum had 4348 inhabitants, mainly Khalkha. The sum center, officially named Erdenet, is located 123 km south-southeast of Mörön and 839 kilometers from Ulaanbaatar.

History 

The Shine-Ider sum was founded in 1923 as Chandmana sum of the Tsetserleg Mandal Uulyn aimag's Chandmana-Ölziit Dalain khoshuu. In 1931, it became the Chandmana sum of the newly founded Arkhangai aimag. In 1942 it became part of Khövsgöl aimag, and was renamed Shine-Ider in 1956. The local Jargalyn Zam (Road of Happiness) negdel was founded in 1954.

Economy 

In 2004, there were roughly 111,000 heads of livestock, among them 62,000 sheep, 35,000 goats, 7,200 cattle and yaks, 5,700 horses, and 56 camels.

Interesting Places 

There are some rock paintings in the area.

Literature 

M.Nyamaa, Khövsgöl aimgiin lavlakh toli, Ulaanbaatar 2001, p. 212f

References 

Districts of Khövsgöl Province